The Champollion Museum is a French historical museum located in Vif in the family home of the Champollion brothers. It presents the daily life of the discoverer of Egyptian hieroglyphs and that of his brother Jacques Joseph while they lived in Grenoble.

The museum opened temporarily in 2004 during the ninth International Conference of Egyptology in Grenoble. It was then closed for renovation. It reopened on June 5, 2021. In February 2020, the museum was named a Musée de France by the Minister of Culture.

The Louvre stores 85 Egyptian objects in this museum.

Gallery

References

External links 

Website

Museums in Isère
Museums established in 2004
2004 establishments in France
Biographical museums in France
Egyptological collections in France